Jalan Bukit Gambir (Johor state route J33) is a major road in Johor, Malaysia. The roads is also a main route to North–South Expressway Southern Route via Bukit Gambir Interchange.

List of junctions

Roads in Johor
Muar District